Batzarre is a political party in Navarre, Spain. It has a branch in the Basque Autonomous Community known as Zutik. It bids to win the political space to the left of the Basque nationalists and the Spanish socialists, the latter eroded for their long-running collusion with the conservative UPN government. It formed on 29 January 2011 the coalition Izquierda-Ezkerra along with Izquierda Unida de Navarra (IUN) and local Socialist figures disillusioned with the party's regional alliances.

History
It formed out of the merger of EMK and LKI, the Basque branch of LCR. It started as a list of candidates in 1987 for the Navarrese Parliament election. In 1991, the party was formally established. It supported Herri Batasuna several times, e.g. in the 1989 Spanish general election, and in the European Parliament election, 1987 and 1989. In 1998 was one of the members of Euskal Herritarrok, but left the coalition after ETA broke the 1998 truce.

However, internal frictions paved the way to the 2011 break-up of the coalition, and the establishment of a new progressive coalition, Izquierda-Ezkerra.

Electoral performance

Parliament of Navarre

 * Within Basque Citizens.
 ** Within Navarre Yes.
 *** Within Left.

References

External links
Official website
Batzarre in the Auñamendi Encyclopedia

1987 establishments in Spain
Communist parties in Spain
Political parties established in 1987
Political parties in Navarre
Unidas Podemos
Left-wing nationalist parties